Ewa Gryziecka-Kwiecińska (born 11 April 1948) is a Polish former track and field athlete who competed in the javelin throw. She is a former world record holder in the event and represented Poland at the Summer Olympics and the European Athletics Championships. In her career, she was twice national champion and twice broke the Polish record.

Biography
Born in Katowice, she moved to Gliwice and began competing for the local sports club, Piast Gliwice. She married Czesław Kwieciński, a Polish Olympic medallist in wrestling, and the pair had three children together, living in Gliwice.

Gryziecka's first major international medal came at the 1966 European Junior Games, where she was a bronze medalist. She began to make her impact at senior level in the early 1970s, placing runner-up at the national championships in 1970 and 1971 behind Poland's leading thrower of the time, Daniela Jaworska. She reached the top of the global seasonal rankings in the 1971 season with her throw of  – a mark just  farther than Jaworska, evidence of the Polish dominance of the period.

The best performance of her career came in 1972, shortly before the Olympics held in Munich. She briefly broke a 13 year long Soviet dynasty in the sport. In spite of the former record having lasted nearly eight years, Gryziecka's throw became among the shortest-lived throwing world records to have been set, as East Germany's Ruth Fuchs, who was competing that same day in Potsdam, went much farther with a throw of  just 35 minutes later. These were the best performances of the year and Gryziecka ranked second to Fuchs on the seasonal rankings.

Gryziecka went on to be a two-time winner at the Polish Athletics Championships, being the national champion in the javelin in 1972 and 1975. She had two major senior international appearances in her career, placing sixth at the 1971 European Athletics Championships and seventh at the 1972 Summer Olympics. She was a gold medallist in the semi-final of her group at the 1975 European Cup. She continued competing until 1979.

International competitions

National titles
Polish Athletics Championships
Javelin throw: 1972, 1975

References

Living people
1948 births
Sportspeople from Katowice
Polish female javelin throwers
World record setters in athletics (track and field)
Olympic athletes of Poland
Athletes (track and field) at the 1972 Summer Olympics